Garkhindi is a village in Parner taluka in Ahmednagar district of state of Maharashtra, India.

Economy
The majority of the population are farmers. But nowadays many residents migrate to Mumbai for jobs, in fact 50% of the people live in Mumbai.

Religion
The population is 90% Hindu and 10% Buddhist.

Gods in Garkhindi
Hanuman - Hanuman is a gramdaivat of Garkhindi.
Limbadevi
Pirsaheba
Malganga Mata
Yamai Devi
Vittal Rukhmini
Mukta Aai Mandir

See also
 Parner taluka
 Villages in Parner taluka

References 

Villages in Parner taluka
Villages in Ahmednagar district